Amphigerontia is a genus of common barklice in the family Psocidae. There are more than 30 described species in Amphigerontia.

Species
These 33 species belong to the genus Amphigerontia:

 Amphigerontia alticola New & Thornton, 1975
 Amphigerontia anchonae Li, 1989
 Amphigerontia anchorae Li, 2002
 Amphigerontia bifasciata (Latreille, 1799)
 Amphigerontia birabeni Williner, 1944
 Amphigerontia boliviana Navas, 1930
 Amphigerontia contaminata (Stephens, 1836)
 Amphigerontia diffusa Navas, 1933
 Amphigerontia feai Ribaga, 1908
 Amphigerontia guiyangica Li, 1990
 Amphigerontia hyalina Enderlein, 1925
 Amphigerontia incerta Ribaga, 1908
 Amphigerontia infernicola (Chapman, 1930)
 Amphigerontia intermedia (Tetens, 1891)
 Amphigerontia jezoensis Okamoto, 1907
 Amphigerontia lata Enderlein, 1926
 Amphigerontia lhasaensis Li, 2002
 Amphigerontia lhasana Li & Yang, 1987
 Amphigerontia limpida Navas, 1920
 Amphigerontia longicauda Mockford & Anonby, 2007
 Amphigerontia minutissima (Enderlein, 1908)
 Amphigerontia montivaga (Chapman, 1930)
 Amphigerontia nadleri Mockford, 1996
 Amphigerontia namiana Navas, 1920
 Amphigerontia nervosa Navas, 1932
 Amphigerontia petiolata (Banks, 1918)
 Amphigerontia shanxiensis Li, 2002
 Amphigerontia sicyoides Li, 2002
 Amphigerontia tincta Navas, 1920
 Amphigerontia titschacki Navas, 1927
 Amphigerontia umbrata Navas, 1927
 Amphigerontia unacrodonta Li, 2002
 Amphigerontia voeltzkowi Enderlein, 1908

References

External links

 

Psocidae
Articles created by Qbugbot